Yevheniy Volodymyrovych Mykytyuk (born 21 September 2005) is a Ukrainian professional footballer who plays as an attacking midfielder for Ukrainian First League club Polissya Zhytomyr.

References

External links
 
 

2005 births
Living people
Place of birth missing (living people)
Ukrainian footballers
Association football midfielders
FC Dynamo Kyiv players
FC Polissya Zhytomyr players
Ukrainian First League players